The Journal of Politics & Society is a biannual academic journal covering the social sciences published by the Helvidius Group, a nonprofit student organization at Columbia University. It was established in 1989 by Columbia University student Peter Tomassi as a magazine distributed to schools in the Ivy League and the US Congress.  It was originally called the Columbia University Journal of Law and Public Policy and was intended to provide undergraduates a platform for meaningful political discourse without regard to partisanship.

The Guest Essay
The guest essay, the only segment written by non-undergraduates, contextualizes the research in the journal within the broader sociopolitical dialogue.  

Past contributors include:
Bill Clinton, former president of the United States
Kofi Annan, former United Nations Secretary-General
Christine Todd Whitman, former New Jersey Governor and EPA Administrator
William Cohen, former Secretary of Defense
Elizabeth Dole, former United States Senator
Hillary Clinton, former first lady, United States Senator, and United States Secretary of State
Daniel Patrick Moynihan, former United States Senator
James D. Wolfensohn, former president of the World Bank
Kenneth Roth, Executive Director of Human Rights Watch
Anthony Marx, President and CEO of the New York Public Library
Kenneth Waltz, former political scientist and founder of neorealism in international relations theory
Andrew J. Nathan, professor at Columbia University

External links

Columbia University academic journals
Political science journals
Biannual journals
English-language journals
Academic journals edited by students
Publications established in 1989